The Christian doctrine of the Trinity (from  'threefold') is the central doctrine concerning the nature of God in most Christian churches, which defines one God existing in three , , consubstantial divine persons: God the Father, God the Son (Jesus Christ) and God the Holy Spirit, three distinct persons sharing one homoousion (essence) As the Fourth Lateran Council declared, it is the Father who s, the Son who is , and the Holy Spirit who proceeds. In this context, the three persons define  God is, while the one essence defines  God is. This expresses at once their distinction and their indissoluble unity. Thus, the entire process of creation and grace is viewed as a single shared action of the three divine persons, in which each person manifests the attributes unique to them in the Trinity, thereby proving that everything comes "from the Father," "through the Son," and "in the Holy Spirit."

This doctrine is called Trinitarianism and its adherents are called Trinitarians, while its opponents are called antitrinitarians or nontrinitarians. Christian nontrinitarian positions include Unitarianism, Binitarianism and Modalism.

While the developed doctrine of the Trinity is not explicit in the books that constitute the New Testament, the New Testament possesses a triadic understanding of God and contains a number of Trinitarian formulas. The doctrine of the Trinity was first formulated among the early Christians and fathers of the Church as they attempted to understand the relationship between Jesus and God in their scriptural documents and prior traditions.

Though the Trinity is mainly a Christian concept, Judaism has had parallel views, especially among writings from the kabbalah tradition.

Jewish background

The Father
According to the Jewish Encyclopedia, God is figuratively called Israel's Father at times, and Husband or Lover at other times, using sexual and familial terms to analogically describe God's love for Israel (God's love for Israel is like a father's love for his son, a husband's love for his wife, or a lover for his beloved).

Son of God
Based on the analogy of divine fatherhood, the "son of God" in Judaism is an analogy for the people of Israel ("my son Israel") and the angels ("sons of God"), because they are holy like, yet distinct from and created by, the Holy One of Israel. God does not have a son, or equals, or parts - in actuality.

Holy Spirit
Medieval rabbis identified the Holy Spirit as the Shekhinah, which is the living throne, or presence, or breath of God, distinct from - and created - by God.

Old Testament 
The Old Testament has been interpreted as referring to the Trinity in many places. One of these is the prophecy about the Messiah in Isaiah 9. The Messiah is called "Wonderful Counselor, Mighty God, Everlasting Father, Prince of Peace." Some see this verse as meaning the Messiah will represent the Trinity on earth. This is because Counselor is a title for the Holy Spirit (John 14:26), the Trinity is God, Father is a title for God the Father, and Prince of Peace is a title for Jesus. This verse is also used to support the Deity of Christ.

Another verse used to support the Deity of Christ is

This is because both the Ancient of Days (God the Father) and the Son of Man (Jesus, Matt 16:13) have an everlasting dominion, which is ascribed to God in Psalm 145:13. 

Some also see 

as Trinitarian since they think it is saying the Lord in heaven is different from the Lord on earth.

People also see the Trinity when the OT refers to  God's word (Psalm 33:6), His Spirit (Isaiah 61:1), and Wisdom (Proverbs 9:1), as well as narratives such as the appearance of the three men to Abraham. However, it is generally agreed among Trinitarian Christian scholars that it would go beyond the intention and spirit of the Old Testament to correlate these notions directly with later Trinitarian doctrine.

Some Church Fathers believed that a knowledge of the mystery was granted to the prophets and saints of the Old Testament, and that they identified the divine messenger of Genesis 16:7, Genesis 21:17, Genesis 31:11, Exodus 3:2 and Wisdom of the sapiential books with the Son, and "the spirit of the Lord" with the Holy Spirit. 

Other Church Fathers, such as Gregory Nazianzen, argued in his Orations that the revelation was gradual, claiming that the Father was proclaimed in the Old Testament openly, but the Son only obscurely, because "it was not safe, when the Godhead of the Father was not yet acknowledged, plainly to proclaim the Son".

Genesis 18–19 has been interpreted by Christians as a Trinitarian text. The narrative has the Lord appearing to Abraham, who was visited by three men. In Genesis 19, "the two angels" visited Lot at Sodom. The interplay between Abraham on the one hand and the Lord/three men/the two angels on the other was an intriguing text for those who believed in a single God in three persons. Justin Martyr, and John Calvin similarly, interpreted it such that Abraham was visited by God, who was accompanied by two angels. Justin supposed that the God who visited Abraham was distinguishable from the God who remains in the heavens, but was nevertheless identified as the (monotheistic) God. Justin interpreted the God who visited Abraham as Jesus, the second person of the Trinity.

Augustine, in contrast, held that the three visitors to Abraham were the three persons of the Trinity. He saw no indication that the visitors were unequal, as would be the case in Justin's reading. Then in Genesis 19, two of the visitors were addressed by Lot in the singular: "Lot said to them, 'Not so, my lord (Gen. 19:18). Augustine saw that Lot could address them as one because they had a single substance, despite the plurality of persons.

Christians interpret the theophanies, or appearances of the Angel of the Lord, as revelations of a person distinct from God, who is nonetheless called God. This interpretation is found in Christianity as early as Justin Martyr and Melito of Sardis, and reflects ideas that were already present in Philo. The Old Testament theophanies were thus seen as Christophanies, each a "preincarnate appearance of the Messiah".

The New Testament 

While the developed doctrine of the Trinity is not explicit in the books that constitute the New Testament, the New Testament contains a number of Trinitarian formulas, including Matthew 28:19, 2 Corinthians 13:14, 1 Corinthians 12:4–5, Ephesians 4:4–6, 1 Peter 1:2, and Revelation 1:4–5. Reflection by early Christians on passages such as the Great Commission: "Go therefore and make disciples of all nations, baptizing them in the name of the Father and of the Son and of the Holy Spirit" and Paul the Apostle's blessing: "The grace of the Lord Jesus Christ and the love of God and the fellowship of the Holy Spirit be with you all", leading theologians across history in attempting to articulate the relationship between the Father, Son, and Holy Spirit. Eventually, the diverse references to God, Jesus, and the Spirit found in the New Testament were brought together to form the doctrine of the Trinity—one Godhead subsisting in three persons and one substance. The doctrine of the Trinity was used to oppose alternative views of how the three are related and to defend the church against charges of worshiping two or three gods.

1 John 5:7–8
Modern Biblical scholarship largely agrees that 1 John 5:7 seen in Latin and Greek texts after the 4th century and found in later translations such as the King James Translation, cannot be found in the oldest Greek and Latin texts. Verse 7 is known as the Johannine Comma, which most scholars agree to be a later addition by a later copyist or what is termed a textual gloss  and not part of the original text. This verse reads:

This verse is absent from the Ethiopic, Aramaic, Syriac, Slavic, Armenian, Georgian, and Arabic translations of the Greek New Testament.

Jesus in the New Testament 
 
In the Pauline epistles, the public, collective devotional patterns towards Jesus in the early Christian community are reflective of Paul's perspective on the divine status of Jesus in what scholars have termed a "binitarian" pattern or shape of devotional practice (worship) in the New Testament, in which "God" and Jesus are thematized and invoked. Jesus receives prayer (1 Corinthians 1:2; 2 Corinthians 12:8–9), the presence of Jesus is confessionally invoked by believers (1 Corinthians 16:22; Romans 10:9-13; Philippians 2:10-11), people are baptized in Jesus' name (1 Corinthians 6:11; Romans 6:3), Jesus is the reference in Christian fellowship for a religious ritual meal (the Lord's Supper; 1 Corinthians 11:17-34). Jesus is described as "existing in the very form of God" (Philippians 2:6), and having the "fullness of the Deity [living] in bodily form" (Colossians 2:9). Jesus is also in some verses directly called God (Romans 9:5, Titus 2:13, 2 Peter 1:1).

The Gospels depict Jesus as human through most of their narrative, but "[o]ne eventually discovers that he is a divine being manifest in flesh, and the point of the texts is in part to make his higher nature known in a kind of intellectual epiphany." In the Gospels Jesus is described as forgiving sins, leading some theologians to believe Jesus is portrayed as God. This is because Jesus forgives sins on the behalf of others, people normally only forgive transgressions against oneself. The teachers of the law next to Jesus recognizes this and said“Why does this fellow talk like that? He’s blaspheming! Who can forgive sins but God alone?” Mark 2:7Jesus also receives  in the aftermath of the resurrection, a Greek term that either expresses the contemporary social gesture of bowing to a superior, either on one's knees or in full prostration (in Matthew 18:26 a slave performs  to his master so that he would not be sold after being unable to pay his debts). The term can also refer to the religious act of devotion towards a deity. While Jesus receives  a number of times in the synoptic Gospels, only a few can be said to refer to divine worship. 

This includes Matthew 28:16-20, an account of the resurrected Jesus receiving worship from his disciples after proclaiming his authority over the cosmos and his ever-continuing presence with the disciples (forming an inclusion with the beginning of the Gospel, where Jesus is given the name Emmanuel, "God with us," a name that alludes to the God of Israel's ongoing presence with his followers throughout the Old Testament (Genesis 28:15; Deuteronomy 20:1). Whereas some have argued that Matthew 28:19 was an interpolation on account of its absence from the first few centuries of early Christian quotations, scholars largely accept the passage as authentic due to its supporting manuscript evidence and that it does appear to be either quoted in the Didache (7:1–3) or at least reflected in the Didache as part of a common tradition from which both Matthew and the Didache emerged. Jesus receiving divine worship in the post-resurrection accounts is further mirrored in Luke 24:52. Acts depicts the early Christian movement as a public cult centered around Jesus in several passages. In Acts, it is common for individual Christians to "call" upon the name of Jesus (9:14, 21; 22:16), an idea precedented in the Old Testament descriptions of calling on the name of YHWH as a form of prayer. The story of Stephen depicts Stephen invoking and crying out to Jesus in the final moments of his life to receive his spirit (7:59–60). Acts further describes a common ritual practice inducting new members into the early Jesus sect by baptizing them in Jesus' name (2:38; 8:16; 10:48; 19:5). According to Dale Allison, Acts depicts the appearances of Jesus to Paul as a divine theophany, styled on and identified with the God responsible for the theophany of Ezekiel in the Old Testament.

The Gospel of John has been seen as especially aimed at emphasizing Jesus' divinity, presenting Jesus as the Logos, pre-existent and divine, from its first words: "In the beginning was the Word, and the Word was with God, and the Word was God" (John 1:1). The Gospel of John ends with Thomas's declaration that he believed Jesus was God, "My Lord and my God!" (John 20:28). There is no significant tendency among modern scholars to deny that John 1:1 and John 20:28 identify Jesus with God.  However, in a 1973 Journal of Biblical Literature article, Philip B. Harner, Professor Emeritus of Religion at Heidelberg College, claimed that the traditional translation of John 1:1c ("and the Word was God") is incorrect. He endorses the New English Bible translation of John 1:1c, "and what God was, the Word was." It should be noted however that Harner claim has been criticized by other scholars. In the same article, Harner also noted that; "Perhaps the clause could be translated, ‘the Word had the same nature as God.” This would be one way of representing John’s thought, which is, as I understand it, that ho logos, no less than ho theos, had the nature of theos," which in his case means the Word is as fully God as the person called "God". John also portrays Jesus as the agent of creation of the universe.

Jesus in later Christian theology
Some have suggested that John presents a hierarchy when he quotes Jesus as saying, "The Father is greater than I", a statement which was appealed to by nontrinitarian groups such as Arianism. However, Church Fathers such as Augustine of Hippo and Thomas Aquinas argued this statement was to be understood as Jesus speaking about his human nature.

Holy Spirit in the New Testament 
Prior Jewish theology held that the Spirit is merely the divine presence of God himself, whereas orthodox Christian theology holds that the Holy Spirit is a distinct person of God himself. This development begins early in the New Testament, as the Spirit of God receives much more emphasis and description comparably than it had in earlier Jewish writing. Whereas there are 75 references to the Spirit within the Old Testament and 35 identified in the non-biblical Dead Sea Scrolls, the New Testament, despite its significantly shorter length, mentions the Spirit 275 times. In addition to its larger emphasis and importance placed on the Spirit in the New Testament, the Spirit is also described in much more personalized and individualized terms than earlier. Larry Hurtado writes;

The Holy Spirit is described as God in the book of the Acts of the ApostlesBut Peter said, “Ananias, why has Satan filled your heart to lie to the Holy Spirit and to keep back for yourself part of the proceeds of the land? 4 While it remained unsold, did it not remain your own? And after it was sold, was it not at your disposal? Why is it that you have contrived this deed in your heart? You have not lied to man but to God.” Acts 5:3-4Peter first says Ananias is lying to the Holy Spirit, he then says he is lying to God.

In the New Testament, the Spirit is not portrayed as the recipient of cultic devotion, which instead, is typically offered to God the Father and to the risen/glorified Jesus. Although what became mainstream Christianity subsequently affirmed the propriety of including the Spirit as the recipient of worship as reflected in the developed form of the Nicene Creed, perhaps the closest to this in the New Testament is in Matthew 28:19 and 2 Corinthians 13:14 which describe the Spirit as the subject of religious ritual.

Holy Spirit in later Christian theology
As the Arian controversy was dissipating, the debate moved from the deity of Jesus Christ to the equality of the Holy Spirit with the Father and Son. On one hand, the Pneumatomachi sect declared that the Holy Spirit was an inferior person to the Father and Son. On the other hand, the Cappadocian Fathers argued that the Holy Spirit was equal to the Father and Son in nature or substance.

Although the main text used in defense of the deity of the Holy Spirit was Matthew 28:19, Cappadocian Fathers such as Basil the Great argued from other verses such as "But Peter said, 'Ananias, why has Satan filled your heart to lie to the Holy Spirit and to keep back for yourself part of the proceeds of the land? While it remained unsold, did it not remain your own? And after it was sold, was it not at your disposal? Why is it that you have contrived this deed in your heart? You have not lied to men but to God. (Acts 5:3–4).

Another passage the Cappadocian Fathers quoted from was "By the word of the Lord the heavens were made, and by the breath of his mouth all their host" (Psalm 33:6). According to their understanding, because "breath" and "spirit" in Hebrew are both "רוּחַ" ("ruach"), Psalm 33:6 is revealing the roles of the Son and Holy Spirit as co-creators. And since, according to them, because only the holy God can create holy beings such as the angels, the Son and Holy Spirit must be God.

Yet another argument from the Cappadocian Fathers to prove that the Holy Spirit is of the same nature as the Father and Son comes from "For who knows a person's thoughts except the spirit of that person, which is in him? So also no one comprehends the thoughts of God except the Spirit of God" (1 Corinthians 2:11). They reasoned that this passage proves that the Holy Spirit has the same relationship to God as the spirit within us has to us.

The Cappadocian Fathers also quoted, "Do you not know that you are God's temple and that God's Spirit dwells in you?" (1 Corinthians 3:16) and reasoned that it would be blasphemous for an inferior being to take up residence in a temple of God, thus proving that the Holy Spirit is equal with the Father and the Son.

They also combined "the servant does not know what his master is doing" (John 15:15) with 1 Corinthians 2:11 in an attempt to show that the Holy Spirit is not the slave of God, and therefore his equal.

The Pneumatomachi contradicted the Cappadocian Fathers by quoting, "Are they not all ministering spirits sent out to serve for the sake of those who are to inherit salvation?" (Hebrews 1:14) in effect arguing that the Holy Spirit is no different from other created angelic spirits. The Church Fathers disagreed, saying that the Holy Spirit is greater than the angels, since the Holy Spirit is the one who grants the foreknowledge for prophecy (1 Corinthians 12:8-10) so that the angels could announce events to come.

Early Christianity

Before the Council of Nicaea

While the developed doctrine of the Trinity is not explicit in the books that constitute the New Testament, it was first formulated as early Christians attempted to understand the relationship between Jesus and God in their scriptural documents and prior traditions.

An early reference to the three “persons” of later Trinitarian doctrines appears towards the end of the first century, where Clement of Rome rhetorically asks in his epistle as to why corruption exists among some in the Christian community; "Do we not have one God, and one Christ, and one gracious Spirit that has been poured out upon us, and one calling in Christ?" (1 Clement 46:6). A similar example is found in the first century  Didache, which directs Christians to "baptize in the name of the Father and of the Son and of the Holy Spirit". 

Ignatius of Antioch similarly refers to all three persons around AD 110, exhorting obedience to "Christ, and to the Father, and to the Spirit". Though all of these early sources do reference the three persons of the Trinity, none articulate full divinity, equal status, or shared being as elaborated by Trinitarians in later centuries.

The pseudonymous Ascension of Isaiah, written sometime between the end of the first century and the beginning of the third century, possesses a "proto-trinitarian" view, such as in its narrative of how the inhabitants of the sixth heaven sing praises to "the primal Father and his Beloved Christ, and the Holy Spirit".

Justin Martyr (AD 100 – c. 165) also writes, "in the name of God, the Father and Lord of the universe, and of our Saviour Jesus Christ, and of the Holy Spirit". Justin Martyr is the first to use much of the terminology that would later become widespread in codified Trinitarian theology. For example, he describes that the Son and Father are the same "being" and yet are also distinct faces, anticipating the three persons that come with Tertullian and later authors. Justin describes how Jesus, the Son, is distinguishable from the Father but also derives from the Father, using the analogy of a fire (representing the Son) that is lit from its source, a torch (representing the Father). At another point, Justin Martyr wrote that "we worship him [Jesus Christ] with reason, since we have learned that he is the Son of the living God himself, and believe him to be in second place and the prophetic Spirit in the third" (1 Apology 13, cf. ch. 60).

The first of the early Church Fathers to be recorded using the word "Trinity" was Theophilus of Antioch writing in the late 2nd century. He defines the Trinity as God, his Word and his Wisdom in the context of a discussion of the first three days of creation, following the early Christian practice of identifying the Holy Spirit as the Wisdom of God.

The first defense of the doctrine of the Trinity was by Tertullian, who was born around 150–160 AD, explicitly "defined" the Trinity as Father, Son, and Holy Spirit and defended his theology against Praxeas, although he noted that the majority of the believers in his day found issue with his doctrine.

St. Justin and Clement of Alexandria referenced all three persons of the Trinity in their doxologies and St. Basil likewise, in the evening lighting of lamps. 

Origen of Alexandria (AD 185 – c. 253) has often been interpreted as Subordinationist — believing in shared divinity of the three persons but not in co-equality. (Some modern researchers have argued that Origen might have actually been anti-Subordinationist and that his own Trinitarian theology inspired the Trinitarian theology of the later Cappadocian Fathers.)

The concept of the Trinity can be seen as developing significantly during the first four centuries by the Church Fathers in reaction to theological interpretations known as Adoptionism, Sabellianism, and Arianism. Adoptionism was the belief that Jesus was an ordinary man, born of Joseph and Mary, who became the Christ and Son of God at his baptism. In 269, the Synods of Antioch condemned Paul of Samosata for his Adoptionist theology, and also condemned the term  ("of the same being") in the modalist sense in which he used it.

Among the nontrinitarian beliefs, the Sabellianism taught that the Father, the Son, and the Holy Spirit are essentially one and the same, the difference being simply verbal, describing different aspects or roles of a single being. For this view Sabellius was excommunicated for heresy in Rome c. 220.

First Council of Nicaea (325) 

In the fourth century, Arianism, as traditionally understood, taught that the Father existed prior to the Son who was not, by nature, God but rather a changeable creature who was granted the dignity of becoming "Son of God". In 325, the First Council of Nicaea adopted the Nicene Creed which described Christ as "God of God, Light of Light, very God of very God, begotten, not made, being of one substance with the Father", and the "Holy Ghost" as the one by which "was incarnate ... of the Virgin Mary". ("the Word was made flesh and dwelled among us"). About the Father and the Son, the creed used the term  (of one substance) to define the relationship between the Father and the Son. After more than fifty years of debate,  was recognised as the hallmark of orthodoxy, and was further developed into the formula of "three persons, one being". 

The Confession of the First Council of Nicaea, the Nicene Creed, said little about the Holy Spirit. At the First Council of Nicea (325) all attention was focused on the relationship between the Father and the Son, without making any similar statement about the Holy Spirit. In the words of the creed:

First Council of Constantinople (381)

Later, at the First Council of Constantinople (381), the Nicene Creed would be expanded, known as Niceno-Constantinopolitan Creed, by saying that the Holy Spirit is worshiped and glorified together with the Father and the Son, suggesting that he was also consubstantial with them:

The doctrine of the divinity and personality of the Holy Spirit was developed by Athanasius in the last decades of his life. He defended and refined the Nicene formula. By the end of the 4th century, under the leadership of Basil of Caesarea, Gregory of Nyssa, and Gregory of Nazianzus (the Cappadocian Fathers), the doctrine had reached substantially its current form.

Middle Ages
In the late 6th century, some Latin-speaking churches added the words "and from the Son" to the description of the procession of the Holy Spirit, words that were not included in the text by either the Council of Nicaea or that of Constantinople. This was incorporated into the liturgical practice of Rome in 1014.  eventually became one of the main causes for the East–West Schism in 1054, and the failures of the repeated union attempts.

Gregory of Nazianzus would say of the Trinity, "No sooner do I conceive of the One than I am illumined by the splendour of the Three; no sooner do I distinguish Three than I am carried back into the One. When I think of any of the Three, I think of Him as the Whole, and my eyes are filled, and the greater part of what I am thinking escapes me. I cannot grasp the greatness of that One so as to attribute a greater greatness to the rest. When I contemplate the Three together, I see but one torch, and cannot divide or measure out the undivided light."

Devotion to the Trinity centered in the French monasteries at Tours and Aniane where Benedict of Aniane dedicated the abbey church to the Trinity in 872. Feast days were not instituted until 1091 at Cluny and 1162 at Canterbury and papal resistance continued until 1331.

Theology

Trinitarian baptismal formula 

Baptism is generally conferred with the Trinitarian formula, "in the name of the Father, and of the Son, and of the Holy Spirit". Trinitarians identify this name with the Christian faith into which baptism is an initiation, as seen for example in the statement of Basil the Great (330–379): "We are bound to be baptized in the terms we have received, and to profess faith in the terms in which we have been baptized." The First Council of Constantinople (381) also says, "This is the Faith of our baptism that teaches us to believe in the Name of the Father, of the Son and of the Holy Spirit. According to this Faith there is one Godhead, Power, and Being of the Father, of the Son, and of the Holy Spirit."  may be taken to indicate that baptism was associated with this formula from the earliest decades of the Church's existence. Other Trinitarian formulas found in the New Testament include in 2 Corinthians 13:14, 1 Corinthians 12:4–6, Ephesians 4:4–6, 1 Peter 1:2 and Revelation 1:4–5.

Oneness Pentecostals demur from the Trinitarian view of baptism and emphasize baptism "in the name of Jesus Christ" only, what they hold to be the original apostolic formula. For this reason, they often focus on the baptisms in Acts. Most scholars of New Testament textual criticism accept the authenticity of the passage, since there are no variant manuscripts regarding the formula, and the extant form of the passage is attested in the Didache and other patristic works of the 1st and 2nd centuries: Ignatius, Tertullian, Hippolytus, Cyprian, and Gregory Thaumaturgus.

One God in three persons  

In Trinitarian doctrine, God exists as three persons but is one being, having a single divine nature. The members of the Trinity are co-equal and co-eternal, one in essence, nature, power, action, and will. As stated in the Athanasian Creed, the Father is uncreated, the Son is uncreated, and the Holy Spirit is uncreated, and all three are eternal without beginning. "The Father and the Son and the Holy Spirit" are not names for different parts of God, but one name for God because three persons exist in God as one entity. They cannot be separate from one another. Each person is understood as having the identical essence or nature, not merely similar natures.

According to the Eleventh Council of Toledo (675) "For, when we say: He who is the Father is not the Son, we refer to the distinction of persons; but when we say: the Father is that which the Son is, the Son that which the Father is, and the Holy Spirit that which the Father is and the Son is, this clearly refers to the nature or substance".

The Fourth Lateran Council (1215) adds: "Therefore in God there is only a Trinity, not a quaternity, since each of the three persons is that reality — that is to say substance, essence or divine nature-which alone is the principle of all things, besides which no other principle can be found. This reality neither begets nor is begotten nor proceeds; the Father begets, the Son is begotten and the holy Spirit proceeds. Thus there is a distinction of persons but a unity of nature. Although therefore the Father is one person, the Son another person and the holy Spirit another person, they are not different realities, but rather that which is the Father is the Son and the holy Spirit, altogether the same; thus according to the orthodox and catholic faith they are believed to be consubstantial. " 

Clarification of the relationships among the three Trinitarian Persons (divine persons, different from the sense of a "human self") advanced in the Magisterial statement promulgated by the Council of Florence (1431–1449), though its formulation precedes the Council: "These three persons are one God and not three gods, for the three are one substance, one essence, one nature, one Godhead, one infinity, one eternity, and everything (in them) is one
where there is no opposition of relationship []". Robert Magliola explains that most theologians have taken  in the "Thomist" sense, namely, the "opposition of relationship" [in English we would say "oppositional relationship"] is one of contrariety rather than contradiction. The only "functions" that are applied  to the Father, Son, and Holy Spirit respectively in Scripture are the following: "Paternity" to the Father, "Filiation" (Sonship) to the Son, and "Passive Spiration" or that which is "breathed out", to the Holy Spirit. Magliola goes on to explain:

Magliola, continuing the Rahnerian stance, goes on to explain that the Divine Persons necessarily relate to each other in terms of "pure negative reference", that is, the three "Is Not" relations represented in the  diagram are in each case a pure or absolute "Is Not". This is the case because the  clause disallows the Persons to "share", qua Persons, the unique role that defines each of them. Lest he be misunderstood, Magliola, in a subsequent publication, makes sure to specify that each of the three Persons, while unique as a Person, is nonetheless—because of the Divine "consubstantiality" and "simplicity"—the one Reality that is God.

Perichoresis 

 (from Greek, "going around", "envelopment") is a term used by some scholars to describe the relationship among the members of the Trinity. His going to the Father, he says, is for their sake; so that he might come to them when the "other comforter" is given to them. Then, he says, his disciples will dwell in him, as he dwells in the Father, and the Father dwells in him, and the Father will dwell in them.

 effectively excludes the idea that God has parts, but rather is a simple being. It also harmonizes well with the doctrine that the Christian's union with the Son in his humanity brings him into union with one who contains in himself, in Paul's words, "all the fullness of deity" and not a part.  provides an intuitive figure of what this might mean. The Son, the eternal Word, is from all eternity the dwelling place of God; he is the "Father's house", just as the Son dwells in the Father and the Spirit; so that, when the Spirit is "given", then it happens as Jesus said, "I will not leave you as orphans; for I will come to you."

Economic and immanent Trinity 
The term "immanent Trinity" focuses on who God is; the term "economic Trinity" focuses on what God does. According to the Catechism of the Catholic Church,

The ancient Nicene theologians argued that everything the Trinity does is done by Father, Son, and Spirit working in unity with one will. The three persons of the Trinity always work inseparably, for their work is always the work of the one God. The Son's will cannot be different from the Father's because it is the Father's. They have but one will as they have but one being. Otherwise they would not be one God. On this point St. Basil said:

According to Thomas Aquinas the Son prayed to the Father, became a minor to the angels, became incarnate, obeyed the Father as to his human nature; as to his divine nature the Son remained God: "Thus, then, the fact that the Father glorifies, raises up, and exalts the Son does not show that the Son is less than the Father, except in His human nature. For, in the divine nature by which He is equal to the Father, the power of the Father and the Son is the same and their operation is the same." Aquinas stated that the mystery of the Son cannot be explicitly believed to be true without faith in the Trinity (ST IIa IIae, 2.7 resp. and 8 resp.).

Athanasius of Alexandria explained that the Son is eternally one in being with the Father, temporally and voluntarily subordinate in his incarnate ministry. Such human traits, he argued, were not to be read back into the eternal Trinity. Likewise, the Cappadocian Fathers also insisted there was no economic inequality present within the Trinity. As Basil wrote: "We perceive the operation of the Father, Son, and Holy Spirit to be one and the same, in no respect showing differences or variation; from this identity of operation we necessarily infer the unity of nature."

The traditional theory of "appropriation" consists in attributing certain names, qualities, or operations to one of the Persons of the Trinity, not, however, to the exclusion of the others, but in preference to the others. This theory was established by the Latin Fathers of the fourth and fifth centuries, especially by Hilary of Poitiers, Augustine, and Leo the Great. In the Middle Ages, the theory was systematically taught by the Schoolmen such as Bonaventure.

Trinity and love 
Augustine "coupled the doctrine of the Trinity with anthropology. Proceeding from the idea that humans are created by God according to the divine image, he attempted to explain the mystery of the Trinity by uncovering traces of the Trinity in the human personality". The first key of his exegesis is an interpersonal analogy of mutual love. In  (399–419) he wrote,

The Bible reveals it although only in the two neighboring verses 1 John 4:8.16, therefore one must ask if love itself is triune. Augustine found that it is, and consists of "three: the lover, the beloved, and the love."

Reaffirming the theopaschite formula  (meaning "One of the Trinity suffered in the flesh"), Thomas Aquinas wrote that Jesus suffered and died as to his human nature, as to his divine nature he could not suffer or die. "But the commandment to suffer clearly pertains to the Son only in His human nature. ... And the way in which Christ was raised up is like the way He suffered and died, that is, in the flesh. For it says in 1 Peter (4:1): 'Christ having suffered in the flesh' ... then, the fact that the Father glorifies, raises up, and exalts the Son does not show that the Son is less than the Father, except in His human nature. For, in the divine nature by which He is equal to the Father."

In the 1900s the recovery of a substantially different formula of theopaschism took place: at least  (meaning "not only in the flesh"). Deeply affected by the atomic bombs event, as early as 1946 the Lutheran theologian Kazoh Kitamori published Theology of the Pain of God, a theology of the Cross pushed up to the immanent Trinity. This concept was later taken by both Reformed and Catholic theology: in 1971 by Jürgen Moltmann's The Crucified God; in the 1972 "Preface to the Second Edition" of his 1969 German book  by Hans Urs von Balthasar, who took a cue from Revelation 13:8 (Vulgate: , NIV: "the Lamb who was slain from the creation of the world") to explore the "God is love" idea as an "eternal super-kenosis". In the words of von Balthasar: "At this point, where the subject undergoing the 'hour' is the Son speaking with the Father, the controversial 'Theopaschist formula' has its proper place: 'One of the Trinity has suffered.' The formula can already be found in Gregory Nazianzen: 'We needed a ... crucified God'."

But if theopaschism indicates only a Christological kenosis (or kenotic Christology), instead von Balthasar supports a Trinitarian kenosis: "The persons of the Trinity constitute themselves as who they are through the very act of pouring themselves out for each other". The underlying question is if the three Persons of the Trinity can live a self-love, as well as if for them, with the conciliar dogmatic formulation in terms that today we would call ontotheological, it is possible that the aseity is valid. If the Father is not the Son or the Spirit since the generator/begetter is not the generated/begotten nor the generation/generative process and vice versa, and since the lover is neither the beloved nor the love dynamic between them and vice versa, Christianity has provided as a response a concept of divine ontology and love different from common sense (omnipotence, omnibenevolence, impassibility, etc.): an oblative, sacrificial, martyrizing, crucifying, precisely kenotic concept.

Trinity and will 
Benjamin B. Warfield saw a principle of subordination in the "modes of operation" of the Trinity, but was also hesitant to ascribe the same to the "modes of subsistence" in relation of one to another. While noting that it is natural to see a subordination in function as reflecting a similar subordination in substance, he suggests that this might be the result of "an agreement by Persons of the Trinity – a 'Covenant' as it is technically called – by virtue of which a distinct function in the work of redemption is assumed by each".

Trinity and Christian apologetics 
Today, several analogies for the Trinity abound. The comparison is sometimes made between the triune God and H2O. Just as H2O can come in three distinct forms (liquid, solid, gas), so God appears as Father, Son, Spirit. The mathematical analogy, "1+1+1=3, but 1x1x1=1" is also used to explain the Trinity.

Political aspect 
According to Eusebius, Constantine suggested the term  at the Council of Nicaea, though most scholars have doubted that Constantine had such knowledge and have thought that most likely Hosius had suggested the term to him. Constantine later changed his view about the Arians, who opposed the Nicene formula, and supported the bishops who rejected the formula, as did several of his successors, the first emperor to be baptized in the Nicene faith being Theodosius the Great, emperor from 379 to 395.

Nontrinitarian Christian beliefs 

Nontrinitarianism (or antitrinitarianism) refers to Christian belief systems that reject the doctrine of the Trinity as found in the Nicene Creed as not having a scriptural origin. Nontrinitarian views differ widely on the nature of God, Jesus, and the Holy Spirit. Various nontrinitarian views, such as Adoptionism, Monarchianism, and Arianism existed prior to the formal definition of the Trinity doctrine in AD 325, 360, and 431, at the Councils of Nicaea, Constantinople, and Ephesus, respectively. Following the adoption of trinitarianism at Constantinople in 381, Arianism was driven from the Empire, retaining a foothold amongst the Germanic tribes. When the Franks converted to Catholicism in 496, however, it gradually faded out. Nontrinitarianism was later renewed in the Gnosticism of the Cathars in the 11th through 13th centuries, in the Age of Enlightenment of the 18th century, and in some groups arising during the Second Great Awakening of the 19th century.

Arianism was condemned as heretical by the First Council of Nicaea and, lastly, with Sabellianism by the Second Ecumenical Council (Constantinople, 381 CE). Adoptionism was declared as heretical by the Ecumenical Council of Frankfurt, convened by the Emperor Charlemagne in 794 for the Latin West Church.

Modern nontrinitarian groups or denominations include Christadelphians, Christian Science, the Church of Jesus Christ of Latter-day Saints, Dawn Bible Students, Iglesia ni Cristo, Jehovah's Witnesses, Living Church of God, Members Church of God International, Oneness Pentecostals, La Luz del Mundo, the Seventh Day Church of God, Unitarian Christians, United Church of God, and The Shepherd's Chapel.

As pointed out by Jonathan Israel, the 17th Century Dutch Republic was more religiously tolerant than other European countries of the time, but its dominant Calvinist Church drew the line at groups who denied the Trinity; this was considered an intolerable aberration, and such groups were subject to various forms  of persecution in the Netherlands.

Other religions' views

Judaism 

Some Kabbalist writings have a Trinitarian-esque view of God, speaking of "stages of God's being, aspects of the divine personality", with God being "three hidden lights, which constitute one essence and one root". Some Jewish philosophers additionally saw God as a "thinker, thinking and thought", taking from Augustinian analogies. The Zohar additionally says that "God is they, and they are it".

Philo the Jew recognized a threefold character of God, but had many differences from the Christian view of the Trinity.  John William Colenso argued that the Book of Enoch implies a Trinitarian-esque view of God, seeing the "Lord of the spirits", the "Elected one" and the "Divine power" each partaking of the name of God.

Judaism traditionally maintains a tradition of monotheism that excludes the possibility of a Trinity. In Judaism, God is understood to be the absolute one, indivisible, and incomparable being who is the ultimate cause of all existence.

Islam 

Islam considers Jesus to be a prophet, but not divine, and God to be absolutely indivisible (a concept known as ). Several verses of the Quran state that the doctrine of the Trinity is blasphemous.

Interpretation of these verses by modern scholars has been varied. Verse 5:73 has been interpreted as a potential criticism of Syriac literature that references Jesus as "the third of three" and thus an attack on the view that Christ was divine. Another interpretation is that this passage should be studied from a rhetorical perspective; so as not to be an error, but an intentional misrepresentation of the doctrine of the Trinity in order to demonstrate its absurdity from an Islamic perspective. David Thomas states that verse 5:116 need not be seen as describing actually professed beliefs, but rather, giving examples of shirk (claiming divinity for beings other than God) and a "warning against excessive devotion to Jesus and extravagant veneration of Mary, a reminder linked to the central theme of the Qur'an that there is only one God and He alone is to be worshipped." When read in this light, it can be understood as an admonition, "Against the divinization of Jesus that is given elsewhere in the Qur'an and a warning against the virtual divinization of Mary in the declaration of the fifth-century church councils that she is 'God-bearer'." Similarly, Gabriel Reynolds, Sidney Griffith and Mun'im Sirry argue that this quranic verse is to be understood as an intentional caricature and rhetorical statement to warn from the dangers of deifiying Jesus or Mary. It has been suggested that the Islamic representation of the doctrine of the Trinity may derive from its description in some texts of Manichaeism "where we encounter a trinity, consisting of a Father, a Mother of Life / the Living Spirit and the Original Man".

Artistic depictions 

The Trinity is most commonly seen in Christian art with the Spirit represented by a dove, as specified in the Gospel accounts of the Baptism of Christ; he is nearly always shown with wings outspread. However depictions using three human figures appear occasionally in most periods of art.

The Father and the Son are usually differentiated by age, and later by dress, but this too is not always the case. The usual depiction of the Father as an older man with a white beard may derive from the biblical Ancient of Days, which is often cited in defense of this sometimes controversial representation. However, in Eastern Orthodoxy the Ancient of Days is usually understood to be God the Son, not God the Father (see below)—early Byzantine images show Christ as the Ancient of Days, but this iconography became rare. When the Father is depicted in art, he is sometimes shown with a halo shaped like an equilateral triangle, instead of a circle. The Son is often shown at the Father's right hand (Acts 7:56). He may be represented by a symbol—typically the Lamb or a cross—or on a crucifix, so that the Father is the only human figure shown at full size. In early medieval art, the Father may be represented by a hand appearing from a cloud in a blessing gesture, for example in scenes of the Baptism of Christ. Later, in the West, the Throne of Mercy (or "Throne of Grace") became a common depiction. In this style, the Father (sometimes seated on a throne) is shown supporting either a crucifix or, later, a slumped crucified Son, similar to the Pietà (this type is distinguished in German as the ), in his outstretched arms, while the Dove hovers above or in between them. This subject continued to be popular until the 18th century at least.

By the end of the 15th century, larger representations, other than the Throne of Mercy, became effectively standardised, showing an older figure in plain robes for the Father, Christ with his torso partly bare to display the wounds of his Passion, and the dove above or around them. In earlier representations both Father, especially, and Son often wear elaborate robes and crowns. Sometimes the Father alone wears a crown, or even a papal tiara.

In the later part of the Christian Era, in Renaissance European iconography, the Eye of Providence began to be used as an explicit image of the Christian Trinity and associated with the concept of Divine Providence. Seventeenth-century depictions of the Eye of Providence sometimes show it surrounded by clouds or sunbursts.

Image gallery

Trinity in architecture 
The concept of the Trinity was made visible in the Heiligen-Geist-Kapelle in Bruck an der Mur, Austria, with a ground plan of an equilateral triangle with beveled corners.

Trinity in literature 
The Trinity has traditionally been a subject matter of strictly theological works focused on proving the doctrine of the Trinity and defending it against its critics. In recent years, however, the Trinity has made an entrance into the world of (Christian) literature through books such as The Shack published in 2007.

See also 

 Ahuric triad
 Ayyavazhi Trinity
 Hypostasis (philosophy and religion)
 Saint Patrick
 Social trinitarianism
 Three Pure Ones
 Trikaya, the three Buddha bodies
 Trimurti, Hinduism
 Tridevi, Hinduism
 Trinitarian Order
 Trinitarian universalism
 Trinity Sunday, a day to celebrate the doctrine
 Triple deity, an associated term in comparative religion
 Triquetra, a symbol sometimes used to represent the Trinity

References

Notes

Citations

Sources

Further reading 

 
 

 
 
 
 Fiddes, Paul, Participating in God : a pastoral doctrine of the Trinity (London: Darton, Longman, & Todd, 2000).
 Johnson, Thomas K., "What Difference Does the Trinity Make?" (Bonn: Culture and Science Publ., 2009).
 Hillar, Marian, From Logos to Trinity. The Evolution of Religious Beliefs from Pythagoras to Tertullian. (Cambridge University Press, 2012).
 
 La Due, William J., The Trinity guide to the Trinity (Continuum International Publishing Group, 2003).
 Morrison, M. (2013). Trinitarian Conversations: Interviews With Ten Theologians. CreateSpace Independent Publishing Platform.
 
 
 
 
 
 So, Damon W. K., Jesus' Revelation of His Father: A Narrative-Conceptual Study of the Trinity with Special Reference to Karl Barth. (Milton Keynes: Paternoster, 2006). .

 
 
 
 Webb, Eugene, In Search of The Triune God: The Christian Paths of East and West (Columbia, MO: University of Missouri Press, 2014)

External links 

 Routledge Encyclopedia of Philosophy, "Trinity" 
 "Trinity" entry at the Stanford Encyclopedia of Philosophy
 A Formulation and Defense of the Doctrine of the Trinity – A brief historical survey of patristic Trinitarian thought
 "Trinity" article at Theopedia
 Eastern Orthodox Trinitarian Theology
 Doctrine of the Trinity Reading Room: Extensive collection of online sources on the Trinity (Tyndale Seminary)

 
Ancient Christian controversies
Attributes of God in Christian theology
Christian terminology
Triple gods
God